Yance Youwei (born January 10, 1989) is an Indonesian footballer who currently plays for Perseru Serui in the Indonesia Super League or Indonesia Soccer Championship.

Club statistics

References

External links

1989 births
Association football defenders
Living people
Indonesian footballers
Papuan sportspeople
Liga 1 (Indonesia) players
Persiram Raja Ampat players